Passauer Neue Presse is a German newspaper established in 1946.  It reports local news from the Passau region of Bavaria as well as international news.

They established a YouTube channel on December 8, 2008, which distributes news in a video format.

References

External links
 

German-language newspapers
Newspapers established in 1946
Daily newspapers published in Germany